Iowa is divided into four congressional districts, each represented by a member of the United States House of Representatives.  The state's congressional map is roughly divided by quadrants in the northeast, northwest, southeast and southwest sections of Iowa.

The districts were represented by three Republicans and one Democrat from the 2014 elections to the 2018 elections.  However, in 2018, two Republican incumbents were ousted by Democratic challengers, flipping the congressional delegation to a three-to-one Democratic majority.  Two years later, with the 2020 elections, the Iowa congressional delegation returned to three Republicans and one Democrat.

Current districts and representatives
List of members of the United States House delegation from Iowa, their terms, their district boundaries, and the district political ratings according to the CPVI. The delegation has a total of 4 members, all Republicans as of 2023.

District boundaries since 1973
Table of United States congressional district boundary maps in the State of Iowa, presented chronologically. All redistricting events that took place in Iowa between 1973 and 2013 are shown.

Obsolete districts
 , obsolete since statehood
  (1846–1847)
 , obsolete since the 2010 census
 , obsolete since the 1990 census
 , obsolete since the 1970 census
 , obsolete since the 1960 census
 , obsolete since the 1940 census
 , obsolete since the 1930 census
 , obsolete since the 1930 census

See also

List of United States congressional districts
United States congressional delegations from Iowa

References

External links